Parmer Hollow is a valley in Iron County in the U.S. state of Missouri.

Parmer Hollow has the name of an early settler.

References

Valleys of Iron County, Missouri
Valleys of Missouri